Sideritis syriaca, commonly known as ironwort, is a plant similar to chamomile, used in the Balkans (where it is known as "mountain tea") to make a tisane. It grows on a high altitude in the mountains. It is commonly found on wet grounds, on the high pastures, above .

References
 

syriaca
Plants described in 1753
Taxa named by Carl Linnaeus